Agioi Theodoroi is a town and a former municipality in Corinthia, Peloponnese, Greece. Since the 2011 local government reform, it is part of the municipality Loutraki-Perachora-Agioi Theodoroi, of which it is a municipal unit. The municipal unit has an area of 98.030 km2.

Agioi Theodoroi is located around 12 km east of Corinth and about 63 km W of Athens in the easternmost part of Corinthia. Its population was 4,643 inhabitants at the 2011 census. The well known "Pefkakia", an organized beach is in the eastern part of the town with many pine trees and golden sand. The west is bounded by the massive Corinth Refinery which is the country's largest industrial complex operated by Motor Oil Hellas with the Kalamaki hills and mountains dominating the northern part, and the Attica boundary with Kineta to its east. The municipality is bounded with Loutraki in the west and Megara in the east. Agriculture used to dominate before the 1960s and the 1970s. Now most of the agricultural land is in the north and the east. Some of the houses are summer homes. It has a beautiful pedestrian street by the sea. Many coffee shops, restaurants and beach bars are lining the sea front of the town. The central avenue of the town is part of the old Athens - Corinth highway. It has many shops and services, supermarkets, pharmacies, banks, restaurants etc. and two historical churches.

History
Northwest of the city of Agioi Theodoroi, in 1961, archaeologists unearthed the ruins of ancient Krommyona. Important discoveries were made like a statue of Apollo, many black-figured vases, geometric and lakoeideis graves. According to Stravona, the entire coastal region of the Saronic and the Eleusinian Gulf was named Krommyona. Krommyona until the 6th century. BC belonged to Megara and then to Corinth.

There are two versions of the name of the ancient Krommyonas. The first version is that it got its name because of the onion production and the second version is that it got its name from the son of Poseidon Krommo.

The area was known from the legend of Faias, the fearsome boar that the legendary hero Theseus killed on his way from Trizina to Athens.

An important finding is also a small circular area which has not been determined whether it was a worship place or a small orchestra theater.

Historical population

Transportation

Agioi Theodoroi is served by motorway 8 (Athens - Corinth - Patras) and a rail station of Proastiakos suburban railway connecting it directly to the city of Athens, to the Athens International Airport and Corinth. Also intercity buses between Athens and the Peloponnese stop here and tourist buses during the summer period.

See also
List of settlements in Corinthia

References

External links

Populated places in Corinthia
Loutraki-Perachora-Agioi Theodoroi